Eastern Maine Railway may refer to:
Eastern Maine Railway (1882), a U.S. railway merged into the Maine Central Railroad in 1936
Eastern Maine Railway (1995), a U.S. subsidiary of the New Brunswick Railway Co.

See also
Maine Eastern Railroad, a U.S. subsidiary of the Morristown and Erie Railway